Lower Sargent Pond is located west of Blue Mountain Lake, New York. Fish species present in the lake are brook trout, and black bullhead. There is access by trail off NY-28.

Tributaries and locations

Middle Sargent Pond – A small 12 acre pond with a max depth of 11 feet, located east of Lower Sargent Pond. There is a trail leading to Middle Sargent Pond from Lower Sargent Pond. The outlet flows into Lower Sargent Pond.

References

Lakes of New York (state)
Lakes of Hamilton County, New York